Robert Thomas Barton (November 24, 1842 – January 17, 1917) was a Virginia lawyer and politician, the author of law and historical books and articles, and a president of the Virginia Bar Association.

Born in Winchester, Virginia he served in the Confederate Army, as did his five brothers, two of whom were killed in the War. In 1865, he was admitted to the bar and became one of the leading lawyers in the state. He was also author of some standard textbooks, Barton’s Law Practice and Barton’s Chancery Practice, and edited a two-volume set of the records of Virginia's colonial courts, Virginia Colonial Decisions: The Reports by Sir John Randolph and by Edward Barradall of Decisions of the General Court of Virginia, 1728-1741, "which has been a landmark reference work for mid-eighteenth century Virginia since its first printing in 1909."

Barton was also a member of the Virginia House of Delegates (1884–85), mayor of Winchester from 1899 to 1903, and sat as chair or president on several state and local organizations. His term as president of The Virginia Bar Association was 1892-93. He was made president of the Farmers and Merchants National Bank of Winchester in 1902.

Barton married twice, first to Katie Knight (1868) and then to Gertrude W. Baker (1890). He had two children with Gertrude. He was buried in Mt. Hebron cemetery.

Notes and references

1842 births
1917 deaths
American book editors
American textbook writers
American male non-fiction writers
Virginia lawyers
Members of the Virginia House of Delegates
Mayors of Winchester, Virginia
Writers from Virginia
American legal writers
Legal historians
Confederate States Army personnel
People of Virginia in the American Civil War
19th-century American politicians
19th-century American lawyers